This is an incomplete list of papal bulls, listed by the year in which each was issued.

The decrees of some papal bulls were often tied to the circumstances of time and place, and may have been adjusted, attenuated, or abrogated by subsequent popes as situations changed.

List

Also note In Coena Domini ("At the Lord's dinner"), a recurrent papal bull issued annually between 1363 and 1770, at first on Holy Thursday, later on Easter Monday.

References

Sources

External links
 Theology Library, with a list
 Cherubini Laertius: Magnum Bullarium Romanum

Bulls